Arnaud Jean-Georges Beltrame (18 April 1973 – 24 March 2018) was a lieutenant colonel in the French Gendarmerie nationale and deputy commander of the Departmental Gendarmerie's Aude unit, who was murdered by a terrorist at Trèbes after having exchanged himself for a hostage. French President Emmanuel Macron said that Beltrame deserved "the respect and admiration of the whole nation." For his bravery and adherence to duty he was posthumously promoted to colonel and made a Commander of the Legion of Honour.

Early life and education
Beltrame was born on 18 April 1973 in Étampes, France.

Beltrame was a double Major de promotion who graduated at the top of his class in 2001 from the French Army EMIA military academy (École militaire interarmes)  and in 2002 from  French Gendarmerie nationale Officers School (École des officiers de la gendarmerie nationale).

Military career

After following a reserve officer cursus during his military service, Beltrame became a serving reserve artillery officer, assigned first to the 35th Airborne artillery regiment in Tarbes and then the 8th artillery regiment in Commercy. He then transferred to the Gendarmerie and was briefly assigned to the Mobile Gendarmerie armored unit in Satory, near Versailles, before being selected in 2003 for the elite gendarmerie parachute squadron (EPIGN), also based at Satory. He deployed to Iraq in 2005 and received military honors for his service there. He then joined the Republican Guard, part of the national gendarmerie that provides guards of honor and security for the State. He was stationed at the Élysée Palace between 2006 and 2010 and then took command of a Departmental Gendarmerie company in Avranches from 2010 to 2014. After staff service with the Ministry of Ecology and post-graduate training in Business administration and Economy, he joined the Carcassonne Departmental gendarmerie unit in southwestern France in August 2017 as deputy commander.

Trèbes terrorist attack 
At about 11 a.m. on 24 March 2018, Redouane Lakdim, a terrorist claiming allegiance to Islamic State of Iraq and the Levant (ISIS) stormed a supermarket in Trèbes armed with a handgun, a hunting knife, and three homemade bombs. He shot two people dead and took others hostage. Police negotiated for release of the hostages, and Beltrame offered to take the place of the final one, a female cashier. Beltrame set his mobile phone on a table with its line open so that police outside could monitor activity inside. After a three-hour stand-off, Lakdim stabbed and shot Beltrame. In response, GIGN operatives stormed the supermarket at 2:40 PM and killed the assailant. An autopsy revealed that Beltrame had sustained four bullet wounds but died from stab wounds to the throat.

Personal life
Beltrame was reared in a nonreligious family but, at age 33, he converted to Catholic Christianity, receiving the sacraments of First Communion and Confirmation in 2008 after spending two years as a catechumen. In 2015, he made a pilgrimage to the Basilica of Sainte-Anne d'Auray, "where he asked the Virgin Mary to help him to meet the woman of his life" and shortly afterwards, "he became friends with Marielle, whose faith is deep and discreet." He had married his partner in a civil ceremony in August 2016, but they had planned a church wedding in June 2018 at the Basilica of Saints Nazarius and Celsus. Prior to the terrorist attack at Trèbes, Beltrame made a pilgrimage to Compostela. Beltrame had also been a Freemason and received public honors from his Grand Lodge, but he had distanced himself from the fraternal order during his last years  He had an interest in the history of France and its Christian roots. A week before his death, Beltrame buried his father, who had drowned in the Mediterranean in August 2017 and whose body had been recently recovered in the nets of a fishing boat.

Homages
Minister of the Interior Gérard Collomb, and then French President Emmanuel Macron, spoke of Beltrame's bravery and heroism.

A national tribute was paid to Beltrame at Les Invalides on 27 March 2018 with Macron presiding. French flags and the banners of the Gendarmerie and the National Assembly were lowered to half-staff and many cities announced that streets, squares or buildings would be named in the colonel's honour.

Military ranks

Decorations
  Legion of Honour (Commander) – 2018, posthumous
  National Order of Merit (Knight) – 2012
  Cross for Military Valour (bronze star with brigade citation) – 2007
  Médaille de la Gendarmerie nationale – 2018, posthumous
  National Defence Medal (golden) – 2009
  Honour medal for courage and devotion (golden) – 2018, posthumous
  Medal for internal security (golden) – 2018, posthumous
  Honour medal of Foreign Affairs (silver) – 2006

References

External links
 

1973 births
2018 deaths
Commandeurs of the Légion d'honneur
Knights of the Ordre national du Mérite
French military personnel
French murder victims
French Roman Catholics
French Freemasons
Officers of the National Gendarmerie
People from Étampes
Converts to Roman Catholicism
French people of Breton descent
Deaths by stabbing in France